Tobias Ten Eyck House and Cemeteries is a historic home and cemeteries located at Coeymans in Albany County, New York.  It was built about 1758 and is a rectangular, -story brick dwelling on a coursed stone foundation.  It is topped by a gambrel roof and end wall chimneys.  The property includes two burial grounds; one for the Ten Eyck family and another for the family slaves.

It was listed on the National Register of Historic Places in 1994.

References

Houses on the National Register of Historic Places in New York (state)
Houses completed in 1758
Houses in Albany County, New York
National Register of Historic Places in Albany County, New York